The Sustainable Minerals Institute (SMI) at the University of Queensland (UQ) is a research institute focused on understanding and implementing the principles of sustainable development through engagement with industry contacts from geology to mining, processing and disposal.

SMI has six Centres:
 BRC: WH Bryan Mining and Geology Research Centre
 CMLR: Centre for Mined Land Rehabilitation
 CSRM: Centre for Social Responsibility in Mining
 CWiMI: Centre for Water in the Minerals Industry
 MISHC: Minerals Industry Safety and Health Centre
 JKMRC: Julius Kruttschnitt Mineral Research Centre

Notable people 
 Bob Bryan, board member and son of WH Bryan

References

External links
homepage
The University of Queensland

Mining organisations in Australia
Mining in Queensland